Markey Wallace  (5 November 1893 – 20 May 1984), generally known as Mark Wallace, was a notable New Zealand cheesemaker, farmer, community leader and local politician. He was born at Waiho, South Westland, New Zealand, in 1893. He was chairman of Westland County Council for 13 years.

In 1953, Wallace was awarded the Queen Elizabeth II Coronation Medal. He was appointed a Member of the Order of the British Empire in the 1965 Queen's Birthday Honours, for services to local government and farming. In the 1977 Queen's Silver Jubilee and Birthday Honours, Wallace was promoted to Commander of the Order of the British Empire.

See also

 List of cheesemakers

References

1893 births
1984 deaths
Cheesemakers
People from the West Coast, New Zealand
Unsuccessful candidates in the 1954 New Zealand general election
Local politicians in New Zealand
New Zealand Commanders of the Order of the British Empire
New Zealand justices of the peace